Lionel Caero (7 February 1951 – November 2014) was a Bolivian sprinter. He competed in the men's 100 metres at the 1972 Summer Olympics.

References

1951 births
2014 deaths
Athletes (track and field) at the 1972 Summer Olympics
Athletes (track and field) at the 1975 Pan American Games
Bolivian male sprinters
Bolivian male long jumpers
Olympic athletes of Bolivia
Place of birth missing
Pan American Games competitors for Bolivia